Malaysian Association of Private Colleges and Universities (MAPCU) established in 1997.

History

Members 
There are 55 ordinary member institutions:

 AIMST University
 Albukhary International University
 Asia Pacific University of Technology & Innovation
 ATC College
 Berjaya University College
 Binary University of Management & Entrepreneurship
 Brickfields Asia College
 Curtin University, Malaysia
 Cyberjaya University College of Medical Sciences
 DISTED College
 DRB-HICOM University of Automotive Malaysia
 DSH Institute of Technology
 ELS Language Centre
 ERICAN College
 First City University College
 FTMS College
 Han Chiang University College of Communication
 HELP University
 Heriot-Watt University Malaysia
 Infrastructure University Kuala Lumpur
 INTI International University
 International College of Music
 International Medical University
 I-Systems Group of Colleges
 KDU University College
 Kolej Teknologi Antarabangsa Cybernetics
 Kuala Lumpur Metropolitan University College
 Limkokwing University of Creative Technology
 Linton University College
 MAHSA University
 Malaysia University of Science & Technology
 Manipal International University
 Melaka-Manipal Medical College
 Monash University Malaysia
 MSU College
 Nilai University
 Perdana University
 Quest International University
 RCSI & UCD Malaysia Campus
 Saito University College
 SEGi University
 Sunway University
 Swinburne University of Technology Sarawak Campus
 TATI University College
 Taylor's College
 Taylor's University
 Tunku Abdul Rahman University College
 UCSI University
 UNITAR International University
 Universiti Sultan Azlan Shah
 Universiti Tun Abdul Razak
 University Malaysia of Computer Science & Engineering
 University of Nottingham Malaysia Campus
 Wawasan Open University

Associate Members 
There are 11 associate member institutions:
 Malaysian Maritime Academy
 Methodist College Kuala Lumpur
 New Era University College
 Southern University College

References

External links 
 

Educational organisations based in Malaysia
Organisations based in Kuala Lumpur